Lake Amara is a saltwater fluvial liman lake located on the Slobozia - Buzău road near Amara in Ialomița County, Romania. 

The lake is situated in a depression having no links to the Ialomița River. Because of the lack of a year-round constant fresh water supply and because of the evaporation process triggered by the dry climate, the concentration of salts in the lake is quite high. The hypertonic water is rich in sulphate salts, bicarbonate, chlorides, iodides, bromides and magnesium salts which led to the formation of a therapeutic mud used to treat different illnesses. The general mineral concentration of the water is around 9.8g/L. The sapropelic mud contains around 40% organic and 41% mineral substances. The mud is recommended to people with affections of the locomotory system, with gynaecologic affections (especially sterility) and dermatosis patients of all kinds. The mud is not recommended to people with cardiovascular diseases, Graves' disease, asthma or infectious diseases.

The Amara Resort located at the shores of the lake has around 2,000 accommodation places in three hotels. At 507 rooms, the Lebăda Hotel is the largest in the resort and one of the largest hotels in the country.

References

Amara
Amara
Geography of Ialomița County